Chita Peninsula (知多半島 Chita Hantō) is a peninsula to the south of Aichi Prefecture, central Honshū, Japan. It runs approximately north-south. To the west is Ise Bay, while to the east it encloses Mikawa Bay. It faces the Atsumi Peninsula southeast across Mikawa Bay. Chūbu Centrair International Airport is located off the west coast of the peninsula.

External links
 (Hazumisaki:Southernmost point)

Peninsulas of Japan
Landforms of Aichi Prefecture